Conohypha is a genus of two species of fungi in the family Meruliaceae. The genus was circumscribed by Swiss mycologist Walter Jülich in 1975. The crust-like fruit bodies of Conohypha are white to cream in colour and membrane-like. The hyphal system is monomitic, meaning it contains only generative hyphae. These hyphae are hyaline with thin walls, and have clamp connections.

References

Meruliaceae
Polyporales genera
Taxa named by Walter Jülich
Fungi described in 1975